Ivan Davidovich Lazarev (Hovhannes Davti Lazarian; ; 	17 October 1820 – 14 August 1879) was an Imperial Russian Army general of Armenian origin.

Biography

Hovhnanes Lazarian (Ivan Lazarev) was born on 17 October 1820 in Shushi in Nagorno Karabakh, then part of the Russian Empire, and studied at a school in that city. In 1839 he began his military career in the Caucasus, where, for his actions, he was made an officer in 1842.

North Caucasus
Before the war in Western Armenia in 1877, General Lazarian made his name in the northern Caucasus. He was assigned, like many officers, to fight in the Murid War in Dagestan against the Imam Shamil. Lazarian, unlike most officers, took the time to study and learn the Tatar language. It was a language that was known throughout the Caucasus region by the peasants, and hence foot soldiers.  With this knowledge he was the first to enter into negotiations with the Muslim rebels and was the one to set up the plans for the peace processes. In 1840 he was involved in the arrest of Hadji Murad. His crowning achievement in this theater was the talks he held with the defeated Shamil, whom he led to choose peace and surrender to the governing forces in 1859. That diplomatic act made him a general after being bestowed military orders of the highest rank.

Russo-Turkish War
Eleven years after his career in Dagestan, he was called to duty on the Armenian soil against the Turks. Finally his skills would be used to save his historic homeland. When Lazarian first got to the area of the military conflict, his role was quiet limited compared to the likes of Count Loris-Melikov and General Arshak Ter-Gukasov. Nevertheless, when duty called upon the general during the strike upon the Aladzhin position, he showed great promise on his front when given the command of the most avant garde divisions in the army, which was the only wheel-transport between Arpachay and Kegacha. With the given forces Lazarian drew back the Turkish forces towards their main location at the Kars province, forces composed of 25 battalions that later laid down their arms to Lazarian. These actions certainly added more ribbons and medals on the chest of the Artsakh general.

An even more memorable occurrence took place during the night of 5 November to the 6 November. Before the divisions marched upon the fortresses around Kars: Hafiz, Kanlyi, Chimon, Taynasm abd Arab-Tabi, Lazarian rode in front of the divisions screaming "Now, with God!" and throwing his military cap in the air and making a sign of the cross. After this successful storming of Kars on the fourth try, victory in the area was certain.

Turkmenistan
In 1879 he was sent to command the expedition that led to the Battle of Geok Tepe (1879). As the campaign was beginning he grew ill, insisted on accompanying the troops and died at Chat on August 14, 1879. He was replaced by Lomakin who made an incompetent attack and was defeated.

On 14 August 1879 Lazarian died while on an expedition on the eastern side of the Caspian Sea.

Notes

External links
 Biography at Armenian Aristocracy and the Military Tradition

1820 births
1879 deaths
Military personnel from Shusha
Imperial Russian Army generals
Russian military personnel of the Russo-Turkish War (1877–1878)
Recipients of the Cross of St. George
Recipients of the Order of St. George of the Second Degree
Recipients of the Order of St. George of the Third Degree
Russian people of Armenian descent
Russian nobility